The following is a list of judges for United States district courts in Missouri. Missouri currently holds two courts: Eastern and Western. These district-level courts are part of the first tier of the U.S. federal judicial system; cases can be appealed to the Eighth Circuit. District court judges are appointed by the president of the United States and confirmed by the United States Senate.

District of Missouri 
A single district court for the District of Missouri was established by Congress on March 16, 1822. The district was subdivided into Eastern and Western districts on March 3, 1857. Between these dates, there were only two judges who served the district. The first, James H. Peck, was impeached but acquitted, and served a total of fourteen years on the bench. The succeeding judge, Robert William Wells, was assigned to the Western District when the District of Missouri was divided.

Eastern District 
Jean Constance Hamilton, appointed by George H. W. Bush in 1990, was the first female judge appointed to the District. The first African American to serve was Clyde S. Cahill Jr., who was appointed by Jimmy Carter in 1980. No Hispanic judges have served on this court. Over the history of the District, five of its judges have been elevated to the Eighth Circuit - Elmer Bragg Adams, John Caskie Collet, Charles Breckenridge Faris, Amos Madden Thayer and William Hedgcock Webster.

Western District

Thirty six judges have been appointed to the Western District of Missouri over the course of its existence. Of those, the most noted is Charles Evans Whittaker, who served on the court only briefly before being elevated to the Eighth Circuit, and then to the Supreme Court of the United States.

Notes

References

 
 

Missouri
United States district court judges